Onanole is a community the Municipality of Harrison Park in Manitoba, Canada.

Onanole is located in southwest Manitoba, at the south entrance to Riding Mountain National Park.

The community was first recognized when a post office opened in 1928, with Neil W. Tracy as postmaster. The name was suggested by Tracy, after the Onanole Hotel in the Adirondack Mountains in northeastern New York, similarly situated "on a knoll".

References

External links
 
 Onanole, Manitoba

Unincorporated communities in Westman Region